George Armstrong Custer (December 5, 1839 – June 25, 1876) was a United States Army officer and cavalry commander in the American Civil War and the American Indian Wars.

Custer graduated from West Point in 1861 at the bottom of his class, but as the Civil War was just starting, trained officers were in immediate demand. He worked closely with General George B. McClellan and the future General Alfred Pleasonton, both of whom recognized his qualities as a cavalry leader, and he was promoted to brigadier general of volunteers at age 23. Only a few days after his promotion, he fought at the Battle of Gettysburg, where he commanded the Michigan Cavalry Brigade and despite being outnumbered, defeated J. E. B. Stuart's attack at what is now known as the East Cavalry Field. In 1864, he served in the Overland Campaign and in Philip Sheridan's army in the Shenandoah Valley, defeating Jubal Early at Cedar Creek. His division blocked the Army of Northern Virginia's final retreat and received the first flag of truce from the Confederates. He was present at Robert E. Lee's surrender to Ulysses S. Grant at Appomattox Court House, Virginia.

After the war, he was commissioned as a lieutenant colonel in the Regular Army and was sent west to fight in the Indian Wars. On June 25, 1876, while leading the 7th Cavalry Regiment at the Battle of the Little Bighorn in Montana Territory against a coalition of Native American tribes, he was killed along with every soldier of the five companies he led after splitting the regiment into three battalions. This action became known as "Custer's Last Stand".
  
His dramatic end was as controversial as the rest of his career, and reaction to his life and career remains deeply divided. His legend was partly of his own fabrication through his extensive journalism, and perhaps more through the energetic lobbying of his wife Elizabeth Bacon "Libbie" Custer throughout her long widowhood.

Family and ancestry
Custer's paternal ancestors, Paulus and Gertrude Küster, came to the North American English colonies around 1693 from the Rhineland in Germany, probably among thousands of Palatines whose passage was arranged by the English government to gain settlers in New York and Pennsylvania.

According to family letters, Custer was named after George Armstrong, a minister, in his devout mother's hope that her son might join the clergy.

Birth, siblings, and childhood
Custer was born in New Rumley, Ohio, to Emanuel Henry Custer (1806–1892), a farmer and blacksmith, and his second wife, Marie Ward Kirkpatrick (1807–1882), who was of English and Scots-Irish descent. He had two younger brothers, Thomas and Boston. His other full siblings were the family's youngest child, Margaret Custer, and Nevin Custer, who suffered from asthma and rheumatism. Custer also had three older half-siblings. Custer and his brothers acquired a life-long love of practical jokes, which they played out among the close family members.

Emanuel Custer was an outspoken Jacksonian Democrat who taught his children politics and toughness at an early age. In a February 3, 1887, letter to his son's widow Libby, Emanuel related an incident from when George Custer (known as Autie) was about four years old: 
"He had to have a tooth drawn, and he was very much afraid of blood. When I took him to the doctor to have the tooth pulled, it was in the night and I told him if it bled well it would get well right away, and he must be a good soldier. When he got to the doctor he took his seat, and the pulling began. The forceps slipped off and he had to make a second trial. He pulled it out, and Autie never even scrunched. Going home, I led him by the arm. He jumped and skipped, and said 'Father you and me can whip all the Whigs in Michigan.' I thought that was saying a good deal but I did not contradict him."

Education

In order to attend school, Custer lived with an older half-sister and her husband in Monroe, Michigan. Before entering the United States Military Academy, Custer attended the McNeely Normal School, later known as Hopedale Normal College, in Hopedale, Ohio. It was to train teachers for elementary schools. While attending Hopedale, Custer and classmate William Enos Emery were known to have carried coal to help pay for their room and board. After graduating from McNeely Normal School in 1856, Custer taught school in Cadiz, Ohio. His first sweetheart was Mary Jane Holland.

Custer entered West Point as a cadet on July 1, 1857, as a member of the class of 1862. His class numbered seventy-nine cadets embarking on a five-year course of study. With the outbreak of the American Civil War in 1861, the course was shortened to four years, and Custer and his class graduated on June 24, 1861. He was 34th in a class of 34 graduates: 23 classmates had dropped out for academic reasons while 22 classmates had already resigned to join the Confederacy.

Throughout his life, Custer tested boundaries and rules. In his four years at West Point, he amassed a record total of 726 demerits, one of the worst conduct records in the history of the academy. The local minister remembered Custer as "the instigator of devilish plots both during the service and in Sunday school. On the surface he appeared attentive and respectful, but underneath the mind boiled with disruptive ideas." A fellow cadet recalled Custer as declaring there were only two places in a class, the head and the foot, and since he had no desire to be the head, he aspired to be the foot. A roommate noted, "It was alright with George Custer, whether he knew his lesson or not; he simply did not allow it to trouble him." Under ordinary conditions, Custer's low class rank would result in an obscure posting, the first step in a dead-end career, but Custer had the fortune to graduate as the Civil War broke out, and as a result the Union Army had a sudden need for many junior officers.

Civil War

McClellan and Pleasanton

Like the other graduates, Custer was commissioned as a second lieutenant; he was assigned to the 2nd U.S. Cavalry Regiment and tasked with drilling volunteers in Washington, D.C. On July 21, 1861, he was with his regiment at the First Battle of Bull Run during the Manassas Campaign, where Army commander Winfield Scott detailed him to carry messages to Major General Irvin McDowell. After the battle, he continued participating in the defense of Washington D.C. until October, when he became ill. He was absent from his unit until February 1862. In March, he participated with the 2nd Cavalry in the Peninsula Campaign in Virginia until April 4.

On April 5, Custer served in the 5th Cavalry Regiment and participated in the Siege of Yorktown from April 5 to May 4 and was aide to Major General George B. McClellan. McClellan was in command of the Army of the Potomac during the Peninsula Campaign. On May 24, 1862, during the pursuit of Confederate General Joseph E. Johnston up the Peninsula, when General McClellan and his staff were reconnoitering a potential crossing point on the Chickahominy River, they stopped, and Custer overheard General John G. Barnard mutter, "I wish I knew how deep it is." Custer dashed forward on his horse out to the middle of the river, turned to the astonished officers, and shouted triumphantly, "McClellan, that's how deep it is, General!"

Custer was allowed to lead an attack with four companies of the 4th Michigan Infantry across the Chickahominy River above New Bridge. The attack was successful, resulting in the capture of 50 Confederate soldiers and the seizing of the first Confederate battle flag of the war. McClellan termed it a "very gallant affair" and congratulated Custer personally. In his role as aide-de-camp to McClellan, he began his life-long pursuit of publicity. He was promoted to the rank of captain on June 5, 1862. On July 17, he was demoted to the rank of first lieutenant. He participated in the Maryland Campaign in September to October, the Battle of South Mountain on September 14, the Battle of Antietam on September 17, and the March to Warrenton, Virginia, in October.

On June 9, 1863, he became aide to Brevet Lieutenant Colonel Alfred Pleasonton, who was commanding the Cavalry Corps, Army of the Potomac. Recalling his service under Pleasonton, he was quoted as saying that "I do not believe a father could love his son more than General Pleasonton loves me." Pleasonton's first assignment was to locate the army of Robert E. Lee, moving north through the Shenandoah Valley in the beginning of what was to become the Gettysburg Campaign.

Brigade command

Pleasonton was promoted on June 22, 1863, to major general of U.S. Volunteers. On June 29, after consulting with the new commander of the Army of the Potomac, George Meade, Pleasanton began replacing political generals with "commanders who were prepared to fight, to personally lead mounted attacks".  He found just the kind of aggressive fighters he wanted in three of his aides: Wesley Merritt, Elon J. Farnsworth (both of whom had command experience), and Custer. All received immediate promotions, Custer to brigadier general of volunteers, commanding the Michigan Cavalry Brigade ("Wolverines"), part of the division of Brigadier General Judson Kilpatrick. Despite having no direct command experience, he became one of the youngest generals in the Union Army at age 23. He immediately shaped his brigade to reflect his aggressive character. 
 
Now a general officer, he had great latitude in choosing his uniform. Though often criticized as gaudy, it was more than personal vanity. Historian Tom Carhart observed that "A showy uniform for Custer was one of command presence on the battlefield: he wanted to be readily distinguishable at first glance from all other soldiers. He intended to lead from the front, and to him it was a crucial issue of unit morale that his men be able to look up in the middle of a charge, or at any other time on the battlefield, and instantly see him leading the way into danger."

Hanover and Abbottstown
On June 30, 1863, Custer and the First and Seventh Michigan Cavalry had just passed through Hanover, Pennsylvania, while the Fifth and Sixth Michigan Cavalry followed about seven miles behind. Hearing gunfire, he turned and started to the sound of the guns. A courier reported that Farnsworth's Brigade had been attacked by rebel cavalry from side streets in the town. Reassembling his command, he received orders from Kilpatrick to engage the enemy northeast of town near the railway station. Custer deployed his troops and began to advance. After a brief firefight, the rebels withdrew to the northeast. This seemed odd, since it was supposed that Lee and his army were somewhere to the west. Though seemingly of little consequence, this skirmish further delayed Stuart from joining Lee. Further, as Captain James H. Kidd, commander of F troop, Sixth Michigan Cavalry, later wrote:  "Under [Custer's] skillful hand the four regiments were soon welded into a cohesive unit...."

Next morning, July 1, they passed through Abbottstown, Pennsylvania, still searching for Stuart's cavalry. Late in the morning they heard sounds of gunfire from the direction of Gettysburg. At Heidlersburg, Pennsylvania, that night they learned that General John Buford's cavalry had found Lee's army at Gettysburg. The next morning, July 2, orders came to hurry north to disrupt General Richard S. Ewell's communications and relieve the pressure on the Union forces. By mid afternoon, as they approached Hunterstown, Pennsylvania, they encountered Stuart's cavalry. Custer rode alone ahead to investigate and found that the rebels were unaware of the arrival of his troops. Returning to his men, he carefully positioned them along both sides of the road where they would be hidden from the rebels. Further along the road, behind a low rise, he positioned the First and Fifth Michigan Cavalry and his artillery, under the command of Lieutenant Alexander Cummings McWhorter Pennington Jr. To bait his trap, he gathered A Troop, Sixth Michigan Cavalry, called out, "Come on boys, I'll lead you this time!" and galloped directly at the unsuspecting rebels. As he had expected, the rebels, "more than two hundred horsemen, came racing down the country road" after Custer and his men. He lost half of his men in the deadly rebel fire and his horse went down, leaving him on foot. He was rescued by Private Norvell Francis Churchill of the 1st Michigan Cavalry, who galloped up, shot Custer's nearest assailant, and pulled Custer up behind him. Custer and his remaining men reached safety, while the pursuing rebels were cut down by slashing rifle fire, then canister from six cannons. The rebels broke off their attack, and both sides withdrew.

After spending most of the night in the saddle, Custer's brigade arrived at Two Taverns, Pennsylvania, roughly five miles southeast of Gettysburg around 3 a.m. July 3. There he was joined by Farnsworth's brigade. By daybreak they received orders to protect Meade's flanks. He was about to experience perhaps his finest hours during the war.

Gettysburg

Lee's battle plan, shared with less than a handful of subordinates, was to defeat Meade through a combined assault by all of his resources. General James Longstreet would attack Cemetery Hill from the west, Stuart would attack Culp's Hill from the southeast and Ewell would attack Culp's Hill from the north. Once the Union forces holding Culp's Hill had collapsed, the rebels would "roll up" the remaining Union defenses on Cemetery Ridge. To accomplish this, he sent Stuart with six thousand cavalrymen and mounted infantry on a long flanking maneuver.

By mid-morning on July 3, Custer had arrived at the intersection of Old Dutch Road and Hanover Road, two miles east of Gettysburg. He was later joined by Brigadier General David McMurtrie Gregg, who had him deploy his men at the northeast corner. Custer then sent out scouts to investigate nearby wooded areas. Meanwhile, Gregg had positioned Colonel John Baillie McIntosh's brigade near the intersection and sent the rest of his command to picket duty two miles to the southwest. After additional deployments, 2,400 cavalry under McIntosh and 1,200 under Custer remained, together with Colonel Alexander Cummings McWhorter Pennington Jr.'s and Captain Alanson Merwin Randol's artillery, who had a total of ten three-inch guns.

About noon Custer's men heard cannon fire, Stuart's signal to Lee that he was in position and had not been detected. About the same time Gregg received a message warning that a large body of rebel cavalry had moved out on the York Pike and might be trying to get around the Union right. A second message from Pleasonton ordered Gregg to send Custer to cover the Union far left. Since Gregg had already sent most of his force off to other duties, it was clear to both Gregg and Custer that Custer must remain. They had about 2,700 men facing 6,000 Confederates.

Soon afterward fighting broke out between the skirmish lines. Stuart ordered an attack by his mounted infantry under General Albert G. Jenkins, but the Union line held, with men from the First Michigan cavalry, the First New Jersey Cavalry, and the Third Pennsylvania Cavalry. Stuart ordered Jackson's four gun battery into action. Custer ordered Pennington to answer. After a brief exchange in which two of Jackson's guns were destroyed, there was a lull.

About one o'clock, the massive Confederate artillery barrage in support of the upcoming assault on Cemetery Ridge began. Jenkins's men renewed the attack but soon ran out of ammunition and fell back. Resupplied, they again pressed the attack. Outnumbered, the Union cavalry fell back, firing as they went. Custer sent most of his Fifth Michigan cavalry ahead on foot, forcing Jenkins's men to fall back. Jenkins's men were reinforced by about 150 sharpshooters from General Fitzhugh Lee's brigade, and shortly after Stuart ordered a mounted charge by the Ninth Virginia Cavalry and the Thirteenth Virginia Cavalry. Now it was Custer's men who were running out of ammunition. The Fifth Michigan was forced back and the battle was reduced to vicious, hand-to-hand combat.

Seeing this, Custer mounted a counterattack, riding ahead of the fewer than 400 new troopers of the Seventh Michigan Cavalry, shouting, "Come on, you Wolverines!" As he swept forward, he formed a line of squadrons five ranks deep – five rows of eighty horsemen side by side – chasing the retreating rebels until their charge was stopped by a wood rail fence. The horses and men became jammed into a solid mass and were soon attacked on their left flank by the dismounted Ninth and Thirteenth Virginia Cavalry and on the right flank by the mounted First Virginia Cavalry. Custer extricated his men and raced south to the protection of Pennington's artillery near Hanover Road. The pursuing Confederates were cut down by canister, then driven back by the remounted Fifth Michigan Cavalry. Both forces withdrew to a safe distance to regroup.

It was then about three o'clock. The artillery barrage to the west had suddenly stopped. Union soldiers were surprised to see Stuart's entire force about a half mile away, coming toward them, not in line of battle, but "formed in close column of squadrons... A grander spectacle than their advance has rarely been beheld". Stuart recognized he now had little time to reach and attack the Union rear along Cemetery Ridge. He must make one last effort to break through the Union cavalry.

Stuart passed by McIntosh's cavalry – the First New Jersey, Third Pennsylvania, and Company A of Purnell's Legion, which had been posted about halfway down the field – with relative ease. As Stuart approached, the Union troops were ordered back into the woods without slowing down Stuart's column, "advancing as if in review, with sabers drawn and glistening like silver in the bright sunlight...."

Stuart's last obstacle was Custer and his 400 veteran troopers of the First Michigan Cavalry directly in the Confererate cavalry's path. Outnumbered but undaunted, Custer rode to the head of the regiment, "drew his saber, threw off his hat so they could see his long yellow hair" and shouted... "Come on, you Wolverines!" Custer formed his men in line of battle and charged. "So sudden was the collision that many of the horses were turned end over end and crushed their riders beneath them...." As the Confederate advance stopped, their right flank was struck by troopers of the Fifth, Sixth, and Seventh Michigan. McIntosh was able to gather some of his men from the First New Jersey and Third Pennsylvania and charged the rebel left flank. "Seeing that the situation was becoming critical, I [Captain Miller] turned to [Lieutenant Brooke-Rawle] and said: 'I have been ordered to hold this position, but, if you will back me up in case I am court-martialed for disobedience, I will order a charge.' The rebel column disintegrated, and individual troopers fought with saber and pistol.

Within twenty minutes the combatants heard the sound of the Union artillery opening up on Pickett's men. Stuart knew that whatever chance he had of joining the Confederate assault was gone. He withdrew his men to Cress Ridge. 
 
Custer's brigade lost 257 men at Gettysburg, the highest loss of any Union cavalry brigade. "I challenge the annals of warfare to produce a more brilliant or successful charge of cavalry", Custer wrote in his report. "For Gallant And Meritorious Services", he was awarded a Regular Army brevet promotion to major.

Shenandoah Valley and Appomattox Court House
General Custer participated in Sheridan's campaign in the Shenandoah Valley. The civilian population was specifically targeted in what is known as the Burning.

In 1864, with the Cavalry Corps of the Army of the Potomac reorganized under the command of Major General Philip Sheridan, Custer (now commanding the 3rd Division) led his "Wolverines" to the Shenandoah Valley where by the year's end they defeated the army of Confederate Lieutenant General Jubal Early in the Valley Campaigns of 1864. During May and June, Sheridan and Custer (Captain, 5th Cavalry, May 8 and Brevet Lieutenant Colonel, May 11) took part in cavalry actions supporting the Overland Campaign, including the Battle of the Wilderness (after which Custer ascended to division command), and the Battle of Yellow Tavern (where J.E.B. Stuart was mortally wounded). In the largest all-cavalry engagement of the war, the Battle of Trevilian Station, in which Sheridan sought to destroy the Virginia Central Railroad and the Confederates' western resupply route, Custer captured Hampton's divisional train, but was then cut off and suffered heavy losses (including having his division's trains overrun and his personal baggage captured by the enemy) before being relieved. When Lieutenant General Early was ordered to move down the Shenandoah Valley and threaten Washington, D.C., Custer's division was again dispatched under Sheridan. In the Valley Campaigns of 1864, they pursued the Confederates at the Third Battle of Winchester and effectively destroyed Early's army during Sheridan's counterattack at Cedar Creek.

Sheridan and Custer, having defeated Early, returned to the main Union Army lines at the Siege of Petersburg, where they spent the winter. In April 1865 the Confederate lines finally broke, and Robert E. Lee began his retreat to Appomattox Court House, pursued by the Union cavalry. Custer distinguished himself by his actions at Waynesboro, Dinwiddie Court House, and Five Forks. His division blocked Lee's retreat on its final day and received the first flag of truce from the Confederate force. After a truce was arranged Custer was escorted through the lines to meet Longstreet, who described Custer as having flaxen locks flowing over his shoulders, and Custer said “in the name of General Sheridan I demand the unconditional surrender of this army.” Longstreet replied that he was not in command of the army, but if he was he would not deal with messages from Sheridan. Custer responded it would be a pity to have more blood upon the field, to which Longstreet suggested the truce be respected, and then added “General Lee has gone to meet General Grant, and it is for them to determine the future of the armies.” Custer was present at the surrender at Appomattox Court House and the table upon which the surrender was signed was presented to him as a gift for his wife by Sheridan, who included a note to her praising Custer's gallantry. She treasured the gift of the historic table, which is now in the Smithsonian Institution. On April 15, 1865, Custer was promoted to major general in the U.S. Volunteers, making him the youngest major general in the Union Army at age 25.

On April 25, after the war officially ended, Custer had his men search for, then illegally seize a large, prize racehorse named "Don Juan" near Clarksville, Virginia, worth then an estimated $10,000 (several hundred thousand today), along with his written pedigree. Custer rode Don Juan in the grand review victory parade in Washington, D.C., on May 23, creating a sensation when the scared thoroughbred bolted. The owner, Richard Gaines, wrote to General Grant, who then ordered Custer to return the horse to Gaines, but he did not, instead hiding the horse and winning a race with it the next year, before the horse died suddenly.

Reconstruction duties in Texas
On June 3, 1865, at Sheridan's behest, Major General Custer accepted command of the 2nd Division of Cavalry, Military Division of the Southwest, to march from Alexandria, Louisiana, to Hempstead, Texas, as part of the Union occupation forces. Custer arrived at Alexandria on June 27 and began assembling his units, which took more than a month to gather and remount. On July 17, he assumed command of the Cavalry Division of the Military Division of the Gulf (on August 5, officially named the 2nd Division of Cavalry of the Military Division of the Gulf), and accompanied by his wife, he led the division (five regiments of veteran Western Theater cavalrymen) to Texas on an arduous 18-day march in August. On October 27, the division departed to Austin. On October 29, Custer moved the division from Hempstead to Austin, arriving on November 4. Major General Custer became Chief of Cavalry of the Department of Texas, from November 13 to February 1, 1866, succeeding Major General Wesley Merritt.

During his entire period of command of the division, Custer encountered considerable friction and near mutiny from the volunteer cavalry regiments who had campaigned along the Gulf coast. They desired to be mustered out of Federal service rather than continue campaigning, resented imposition of discipline (particularly from an Eastern Theater general), and considered Custer nothing more than a vain dandy.

Custer's division was mustered out beginning in November 1865, replaced by the regulars of the U.S. 6th Cavalry Regiment. Although their occupation of Austin had apparently been pleasant, many veterans harbored deep resentments against Custer, particularly in the 2nd Wisconsin Cavalry, because of his attempts to maintain discipline. Upon its mustering out, several members planned to ambush Custer, but he was warned the night before and the attempt thwarted.

Post-war options

On February 1, 1866, Major General Custer mustered out of the U.S. volunteer service and took an extended leave of absence and awaited orders until September 24. He explored options in New York City, where he considered careers in railroads and mining. Offered a position (and $10,000 in gold) as adjutant general of the army of Benito Juárez of Mexico, who was then in a struggle with the Mexican Emperor Maximilian I (a satellite ruler of French Emperor Napoleon III), Custer applied for a one-year leave of absence from the U.S. Army, which was endorsed by Grant and Secretary Stanton. Sheridan and Mrs. Custer disapproved, however, and when his request for leave was opposed by U.S. Secretary of State William H. Seward, who was against having an American officer commanding foreign troops, Custer refused the alternative of resignation from the Army to take the lucrative post.

Following the death of his father-in-law in May 1866, Custer returned to Monroe, Michigan, where he considered running for Congress. He took part in public discussion over the treatment of the American South in the aftermath of the Civil War, advocating a policy of moderation. He was named head of the Soldiers and Sailors Union, regarded as a response to the hyper-partisan Grand Army of the Republic (GAR). Also formed in 1866, it was led by Republican activist John Alexander Logan.

In September 1866, Custer accompanied President Andrew Johnson on a journey by train known as the "Swing Around the Circle" to build up public support for Johnson's policies towards the South. Custer denied a charge by the newspapers that Johnson had promised him a colonel's commission in return for his support, but Custer had written to Johnson some weeks before seeking such a commission. Custer and his wife stayed with the president during most of the trip. At one point Custer confronted a small group of Ohio men who repeatedly jeered Johnson, saying to them: "I was born two miles and a half from here, but I am ashamed of you."

Indian Wars

On July 28, 1866, Custer was appointed lieutenant colonel of the newly created 7th Cavalry Regiment, which was headquartered at Fort Riley, Kansas. He served on frontier duty at Fort Riley from October 18 to March 26, and scouted in Kansas and Colorado until July 28, 1867. He took part in Major General Winfield Scott Hancock's expedition against the Cheyenne. On June 26, Lt. Lyman Kidder's party, made up of ten troopers and one scout, were massacred while en route to Fort Wallace. Lt. Kidder was to deliver dispatches to Custer from General Sherman, but his party was attacked by Lakota Sioux and Cheyenne. Days later, Custer and a search party found the bodies of Kidder's patrol.

Following the Hancock campaign, Custer was arrested and suspended at Fort Leavenworth, Kansas, until August 12, 1868, for being AWOL, after having abandoned his post to see his wife. At the request of Major General Sheridan, who wanted him for his planned winter campaign against the Cheyenne, he was allowed to return to duty before his one year term of suspension had expired and joined his regiment to October 7, 1868. He then went on frontier duty, scouting in Kansas and Indian Territory to October 1869.

Under Sheridan's orders, he took part in establishing Camp Supply in Indian Territory in early November 1868 as a supply base for the winter campaign. On November 27, 1868, he led the 7th Cavalry Regiment in an attack on the Cheyenne encampment of Chief Black Kettle – the Battle of Washita River. He reported killing 103 warriors and some women and children; 53 women and children were taken as prisoners. Estimates by the Cheyenne of their casualties were substantially lower (11 warriors plus 19 women and children). Custer had his men shoot most of the 875 Indian ponies they had captured. The Battle of Washita River was regarded as the first substantial U.S. victory in the Southern Plains War, and it helped force a large portion of the Southern Cheyenne onto a U.S.-assigned reservation.

In 1873, he was sent to the Dakota Territory to protect a railroad survey party against the Lakota. On August 4, 1873, near the Tongue River, the 7th Cavalry Regiment clashed for the first time with the Lakota. One man on each side was killed. In 1874 Custer led an expedition into the Black Hills and announced the discovery of gold on French Creek near present-day Custer, South Dakota. Custer's announcement triggered the Black Hills Gold Rush. Among the towns that immediately sprung up was Deadwood, South Dakota, notorious for its lawlessness.

Grant, Belknap and politics

In 1875, the Grant administration attempted to buy the Black Hills region from the Sioux. When the Sioux refused to sell, they were ordered to report to reservations by the end of January, 1876. Mid-winter conditions made it impossible for them to comply. The administration labeled them "hostiles" and tasked the Army with bringing them in. Custer was to command an expedition planned for the spring, part of a three-pronged campaign. While Custer's expedition marched west from Fort Abraham Lincoln, near present-day Mandan, North Dakota, troops under Colonel John Gibbon were to march east from Fort Ellis, near present-day Bozeman, Montana, while a force under General George Crook was to march north from Fort Fetterman, near present-day Douglas, Wyoming.

Custer's 7th Cavalry was originally scheduled to leave Fort Abraham Lincoln on April 6, 1876, but on March 15 he was summoned to Washington to testify at congressional hearings. Rep. Hiester Clymer's Committee was investigating alleged corruption involving Secretary of War William W. Belknap (who had resigned March 2), President Grant's brother Orville and traders granted monopolies at frontier Army posts. It was alleged that Belknap had been selling these lucrative trading post positions where soldiers were required to make their purchases. Custer himself had experienced first hand the high prices being charged at Fort Lincoln.

Concerned that he might miss the coming campaign, Custer did not want to go to Washington. He asked to answer questions in writing, but Clymer insisted. Recognizing that his testimony would be explosive, Custer tried "to follow a moderate and prudent course, avoiding prominence." Despite this, he provided a quantity of unsubstantiated accusations against Belknap. His testimony, given on March 29 and April 4, was a sensation, being loudly praised by the Democratic press and sharply criticized by Republicans. Custer wrote articles published anonymously in The New York Herald that exposed trader post kickback rings and implied that Belknap was behind them. During his testimony, Custer attacked President Grant's brother Orville on unproven grounds of extorting money in exchange for exerting undue influence. Historian Stephen E. Ambrose speculated that around this time Custer was presented with the idea of becoming the Democratic candidate in the upcoming 1876 United States presidential election, adding further motivation for Custer to rejoin his regiment and win further accolades in the Sioux Wars.

After Custer testified, Belknap was impeached and the case sent to the Senate for trial. Custer asked the impeachment managers to release him from further testimony. With the help of a request from his superior, Brigadier General Alfred Terry, Commander of the Department of Dakota, he was excused. However, President Grant intervened, ordering that another officer fulfill Custer's military duty.
General Terry protested, arguing that he had no available officers of rank qualified to replace Custer. Both Sheridan and Sherman wanted Custer in command but had to support Grant. General Sherman, hoping to resolve the issue, advised Custer to meet personally with Grant before leaving Washington. Three times Custer requested meetings with the president, but each request was refused.

Finally, Custer gave up and took a train to Chicago on May 2, planning to rejoin his regiment. A furious Grant ordered Sheridan to arrest Custer for leaving Washington without permission. On May 3, a member of Sheridan's staff arrested Custer as he arrived in Chicago. The arrest sparked public outrage. The New York Herald called Grant the "modern Caesar" and asked, "Are officers... to be dragged from railroad trains and ignominiously ordered to stand aside until the whims of the Chief magistrate ... are satisfied?"
Grant relented but insisted that Terry—not Custer—personally command the expedition. Terry met Custer in St. Paul, Minnesota, on May 6. He later recalled that Custer "with tears in his eyes, begged for my aid. How could I resist it?" Custer and Terry both wrote telegrams to Grant asking that Custer lead his regiment, with Terry in command. Sheridan endorsed the effort.

Grant was already under pressure for his treatment of Custer. His administration worried that if the "Sioux campaign" failed without Custer, then Grant would be blamed for ignoring the recommendations of senior Army officers. On May 8, Custer was told that he would lead the expedition, but only under Terry's direct supervision.
Elated, Custer told General Terry's chief engineer, Captain Ludlow, that he would "cut loose" from Terry and operate independently.

Battle of the Little Bighorn

By the time of Custer's Black Hills expedition in 1874, the level of conflict and tension between the U.S. and many of the Plains Indians tribes (including the Lakota Sioux and the Cheyenne) had become exceedingly high. European-Americans continually broke treaty agreements and advanced further westward, resulting in violence and acts of depredation by both sides. To take possession of the Black Hills (and thus the gold deposits), and to stop Indian attacks, the U.S. decided to corral all remaining free Plains Indians. The Grant government set a deadline of January 31, 1876, for all Lakota and Arapaho wintering in the "unceded territory" to report to their designated agencies (reservations) or be considered "hostile".
 
At that time the 7th Cavalry's regimental commander, Colonel Samuel D. Sturgis, was on detached duty as the Superintendent of Mounted Recruiting Service and in command of the Cavalry Depot in St. Louis, Missouri, which left Lieutenant Colonel Custer in command of the regiment. Custer and the 7th Cavalry departed from Fort Abraham Lincoln on May 17, 1876, part of a larger army force planning to round up remaining free Indians. Meanwhile, in the spring and summer of 1876, the Hunkpapa Lakota holy man Sitting Bull had called together the largest ever gathering of Plains Indians at Ash Creek, Montana (later moved to the Little Bighorn River) to discuss what to do about the whites. It was this united encampment of Lakota, Northern Cheyenne, and Arapaho Indians that the 7th met at the Battle of the Little Bighorn in the Crow Indian Reservation created in old Crow Country. (In the Fort Laramie Treaty (1851), the valley of the Little Bighorn is in the heart of the Crow Indian treaty territory and accepted as such by the Lakota, the Cheyenne and the Arapaho). The Lakotas were staying in the valley without consent from the Crow tribe, which sided with the Army to expel the Indian invaders.

About June 15, Major Marcus Reno, while on a scout, discovered the trail of a large village on the Rosebud River. On June 22, Custer's entire regiment was detached to follow this trail. On June 25, some of Custer's Crow Indian scouts identified what they claimed was a large Indian encampment in the valley near the Little Bighorn River. Custer had first intended to attack the Indian village the next day, but since his presence was known, he decided to attack immediately and divided his forces into three battalions: one led by Major Reno, one by Captain Frederick Benteen, and one by himself. Captain Thomas M. McDougall and Company B were with the pack train. Reno was sent north to charge the southern end of the encampment, Custer rode north, hidden to the east of the encampment by bluffs and planning to circle around and attack from the north, and Benteen was initially sent south and west to scout Indian presence and potentially protect the column from the south.

Reno began a charge on the southern end of the village but halted some 500–600 yards short of the camp, and had his men dismount and form a skirmish line. They were soon overcome by mounted Lakota and Cheyenne warriors who counterattacked en masse against Reno's exposed left flank, forcing Reno and his men to take cover in the trees along the river. Eventually, however, the troopers engaged in a bloody retreat up onto the bluffs above the river, where they made their own stand. This, the opening action of the battle, cost Reno a quarter of his command.

Custer may have seen Reno stop and form a skirmish line as Custer led his command to the northern end of the main encampment, where he may have planned to sandwich the Indians between his attacking troopers and Reno's command in a "hammer and anvil" maneuver. According to Grinnell's account, based on the testimony of the Cheyenne warriors who survived the fight, at least part of Custer's command attempted to ford the river at the north end of the camp but were driven off by Indian sharpshooters firing from the brush along the west bank of the river. From that point the soldiers were pursued by hundreds of warriors onto a ridge north of the encampment. Custer and his command were prevented from digging in by Crazy Horse however, whose warriors had outflanked him and were now to his north, at the crest of the ridge. Traditional white accounts attribute to Gall the attack that drove Custer up onto the ridge, but Indian witnesses have disputed that account.

For a time, Custer's men appear to have been deployed by company, in standard cavalry fighting formation—the skirmish line, with every fourth man holding the horses, though this arrangement would have robbed Custer of a quarter of his firepower. Worse, as the fight intensified, many soldiers could have taken to holding their own horses or hobbling them, further reducing the 7th's effective fire. When Crazy Horse and White Bull mounted the charge that broke through the center of Custer's lines, order may have broken down among the soldiers of Calhoun's command, though Myles Keogh's men seem to have fought and died where they stood. According to some Lakota accounts, many of the panicking soldiers threw down their weapons and either rode or ran towards the knoll where Custer, the other officers, and about 40 men were making a stand. Along the way, the warriors rode them down, counting coup by striking the fleeing troopers with their quirts or lances.

Initially, Custer had 208 officers and men under his direct command, with an additional 142 under Reno, just over 100 under Benteen, and 50 soldiers with Captain McDougall's rearguard, accompanying 84 soldiers under 1st Lieutenant Edward Gustave Mathey with the pack train. The Lakota-Cheyenne coalition may have fielded over 1,800 warriors. Historian Gregory Michno settles on a low number of around 1,000 based on contemporary Lakota testimony, but other sources place the number at 1,800 or 2,000, especially in the works by Utley and Fox. The 1,800–2,000 figure is substantially lower than the higher numbers of 3,000 or more postulated by Ambrose, Gray, Scott, and others. Some of the other participants in the battle gave higher estimates:

Spotted Horn Bull – 5,000 braves and leaders
Maj. Reno – 2,500 to 5,000 warriors
Capt. Moylan – 3,500 to 4,000
Lt. Hare – not under 4,000
Lt. Godfrey – minimum between 2,500 and 3,000
Lt. Edgerly – 4,000
Lt. Varnum – not less than 4,000
Sgt. Kanipe – fully 4,000
George Herendeen – fully 3,000
Fred Gerard – 2,500 to 3,000

An average of the above is 3,500 Indian warriors and leaders.

As the troopers of Custer's five companies were cut down, the native warriors stripped the dead of their firearms and ammunition, with the result that the return fire from the cavalry steadily decreased, while the fire from the Indians constantly increased. The surviving troopers apparently shot their remaining horses to use as breastworks for a final stand on the knoll at the north end of the ridge. The warriors closed in for the final attack and killed every man in Custer's command. As a result, the Battle of the Little Bighorn has come to be popularly known as "Custer's Last Stand".

Personal life

On February 9, 1864, Custer married Elizabeth Clift Bacon (1842–1933), whom he had first seen when he was ten years old. He had been socially introduced to her in November 1862, when home in Monroe on leave. She was not initially impressed with him, and her father, Judge Daniel Bacon, disapproved of Custer as a match because he was the son of a blacksmith. It was not until well after Custer had been promoted to the rank of brigadier general that he gained the approval of Judge Bacon. He married Elizabeth Bacon fourteen months after they formally met.

In November 1868, following the Battle of Washita River, Custer was alleged (by Captain Frederick Benteen, chief of scouts Ben Clark, and Cheyenne oral tradition) to have unofficially married Mo-nah-se-tah, daughter of the Cheyenne chief Little Rock in the winter or early spring of 1868–1869 (Little Rock was killed in the one-day action at Washita on November 27). Mo-nah-se-tah gave birth to a child in January 1869, two months after the Washita battle. Cheyenne oral history tells that she also bore a second child fathered by Custer in late 1869. Some historians, however, believe that Custer had become sterile after contracting gonorrhea while at West Point and that the father was in actuality his brother Thomas. Clarke's description in his memoirs included the statement, "Custer picked out a fine looking one and had her in his tent every night."

Death
It is unlikely that any Native American recognized Custer during or after the battle. Michno summarizes: "Shave Elk said, 'We did not suspect that we were fighting Custer and did not recognize him either alive or dead.' Wooden Leg said no one could recognize any enemy during the fight, for they were too far away. The Cheyennes did not even know a man named Custer was in the fight until weeks later. Antelope said none knew of Custer being at the fight until they later learned of it at the agencies. Thomas Marquis learned from his interviews that no Indian knew Custer was at the Little Bighorn fight until months later. Many Cheyennes were not even aware that other members of the Custer family had been in the fight until 1922 when Marquis himself first informed them of that fact."

Several individuals claimed responsibility for killing Custer, including White Bull of the Miniconjous, Rain-in-the-Face, Flat Lip, and Brave Bear. In June 2005, at a public meeting, Northern Cheyenne storytellers said that according to their oral tradition, Buffalo Calf Road Woman, a Northern Cheyenne heroine of the Battle of the Rosebud, struck the final blow against Custer, which knocked him off his horse before he died.

A contrasting version of Custer's death is suggested by the testimony of an Oglala named Joseph White Cow Bull, according to novelist and Custer biographer Evan Connell. He says that Joseph White Bull stated he had shot a rider wearing a buckskin jacket and big hat at the riverside when the soldiers first approached the village from the east. The initial force facing the soldiers, according to this version, was quite small (possibly as few as four warriors) yet challenged Custer's command. The rider who was hit was mounted next to a rider who bore a flag and had shouted orders that prompted the soldiers to attack, but when the buckskin-clad rider fell off his horse after being shot, many of the attackers reined up. The allegation that the buckskin-clad officer was Custer, if accurate, might explain the supposed rapid disintegration of Custer's forces. However, several other officers of the Seventh, including William Cooke, Tom Custer and William Sturgis, were also dressed in buckskin on the day of the battle, and the fact that each of the non-mutilation wounds to George Custer's body (a bullet wound below the heart and a shot to the left temple) would have been instantly fatal casts doubt on his being wounded or killed at the ford, more than a mile from where his body was found. The circumstances are, however, consistent with David Humphreys Miller's suggestion that Custer's attendants would not have left his dead body behind to be desecrated.

During the 1920s, two elderly Cheyenne women spoke briefly with oral historians about their having recognized Custer's body on the battlefield and said that they had stopped a Sioux warrior from desecrating the body. The women were relatives of Mo-nah-se-tah, who was alleged to have been Custer's lover in late 1868 and through 1869, and borne two children by him. Mo-nah-se-tah was among 53 Cheyenne women and children taken captive by the 7th Cavalry after the Battle of Washita River in 1868, in which Custer commanded an attack on the camp of Chief Black Kettle. Mo-nah-se-tah's father, Cheyenne chief Little Rock, was killed in the battle. During the winter and early spring of 1868–1869, Custer reportedly sexually assaulted teenage Mo-nah-se-tah. Cheyenne oral history alleges that she later bore Custer's child in late 1869. (Custer, however, had apparently become sterile after contracting venereal disease at West Point, leading some historians to believe that the father was really his brother Thomas). In the Cheyenne culture of the time, such a relationship was considered a marriage. The women allegedly told the warrior: "Stop, he is a relative of ours," and then shooed him away. The two women said they shoved their sewing awls into his ears to permit Custer's corpse to "hear better in the afterlife" because he had broken his promise to Stone Forehead never to fight against Native Americans again.

When the main column under General Terry arrived two days later, the army found most of the soldiers' corpses stripped, scalped, and mutilated. Custer's body had two bullet holes, one in the left temple and one just below the heart. Capt. Benteen, who inspected the body, stated that in his opinion the fatal injuries had not been the result of .45 caliber ammunition, which implies the bullet holes had been caused by ranged rifle fire. Some time later, Lieutenant Edward S. Godfrey described Custer's mutilation, telling Charles F. Bates that an arrow "had been forced up his penis."

The bodies of Custer and his brother Tom were wrapped in canvas and blankets, then buried in a shallow grave, covered by the basket from a travois held in place by rocks. When soldiers returned a year later, the brothers' grave had been scavenged by animals and the bones scattered. "Not more than a double handful of small bones were picked up." Custer was reinterred with full military honors at West Point Cemetery on October 10, 1877. The battle site was designated a National Cemetery in 1886.

Controversial legacy

Public relations and media coverage during his lifetime
Custer has been called a "media personality", and he valued good public relations and used the print media of his era effectively. He frequently invited journalists to accompany his campaigns (one, Associated Press reporter Mark Kellogg, died at the Little Bighorn), and their favorable reporting contributed to his high reputation, which lasted well into the latter 20th century.

Custer enjoyed writing, often writing all night long. He wrote a series of magazine articles of his experiences on the frontier, which were published in book form as My Life on the Plains in 1874. The work is still a valued primary source for information on U.S.-Native relations.

Posthumous legacy
After his death, Custer achieved lasting fame. Custer's wife, Elizabeth, who had accompanied him in many of his frontier expeditions, did much to advance this view with the publication of several books about her late husband: Boots and Saddles, Life with General Custer in Dakota, Tenting on the Plains, or General Custer in Kansas and Texas and Following the Guidon.
The deaths of Custer and his troops became the best-known episode in the history of the American Indian Wars, due in part to a painting commissioned by the brewery Anheuser-Busch as part of an advertising campaign. The enterprising company ordered reprints of a dramatic work that depicted "Custer's Last Stand" and had them framed and hung in many United States saloons. This created lasting impressions of the battle and the brewery's products in the minds of many bar patrons. Henry Wadsworth Longfellow wrote an adoring (and in some places, erroneous) poem. President Theodore Roosevelt's lavish praise pleased Custer's widow.

President Grant, a highly successful general but recent antagonist, criticized Custer's actions in the battle of the Little Bighorn. Quoted in the New York Herald on September 2, 1876, Grant said, "I regard Custer's Massacre as a sacrifice of troops, brought on by Custer himself, that was wholly unnecessary – wholly unnecessary." General Phillip Sheridan took a more moderately critical view of Custer's final military actions.

General Nelson Miles (who inherited Custer's mantle of famed Indian fighter) and others praised him as a fallen hero betrayed by the incompetence of subordinate officers. Miles noted the difficulty of winning a fight "with seven-twelfths of the command remaining out of the engagement when within sound of his rifle shots."

The assessment of Custer's actions during the American Indian Wars has undergone substantial reconsideration in modern times. Documenting the arc of popular perception in his biography Son of the Morning Star (1984), author Evan Connell notes the reverential tone of Custer's first biographer Frederick Whittaker (whose book was rushed out the year of Custer's death.) Connell concludes:

These days it is stylish to denigrate the general, whose stock sells for nothing. Nineteenth-century Americans thought differently. At that time he was a cavalier without fear and beyond reproach.

Criticism and controversy

Debate over tactics

The controversy over blame for the disaster at Little Bighorn continues to this day. Major Marcus Reno's failure to press his attack on the south end of the Lakota/Cheyenne village and his flight to the timber along the river after a single casualty have been cited as a factor in the destruction of Custer's battalion, as has Captain Frederick Benteen's allegedly tardy arrival on the field, and the failure of the two officers' combined forces to move toward the relief of Custer.
Some of Custer's critics have asserted tactical errors.
 While camped at Powder River, Custer refused the support offered by General Terry on June 21 of an additional four companies of the Second Cavalry. Custer stated that he "could whip any Indian village on the Plains" with his own regiment, and that extra troops would simply be a burden.
 At the same time, he left behind at the steamer Far West, on the Yellowstone, a battery of Gatling guns, knowing he was facing superior numbers. Before leaving the camp all the troops, including the officers, also boxed their sabers and sent them back with the wagons.
 On the day of the battle, Custer divided his 600-man command, despite being faced with vastly superior numbers of Sioux and Cheyenne.
 The refusal of an extra battalion reduced the size of his force by at least a sixth, and rejecting the firepower offered by the Gatling guns played into the events of June 25 to the disadvantage of his regiment.

Custer's defenders, however, including historian Charles K. Hofling, have asserted that Gatling guns would have been slow and cumbersome as the troops crossed the rough country between the Yellowstone and the Little Bighorn. Custer rated speed in gaining the battlefield as essential and more important. Supporters of Custer claim that splitting the forces was a standard tactic, so as to demoralize the enemy with the appearance of the cavalry in different places all at once, especially when a contingent threatened the line of retreat.

Attacks on Indigenous peoples

Sharply criticizing the self-styled "Indian fighter", U.S. Indigenous people's organized movements have emphasized Custer's role in the U.S. government's treaty violations and other injustices against Native Americans.

Standing Rock Sioux theologian and author Vine Deloria Jr. made an emotionally-charged comparison between Custer and Nazi SS officer Adolf Eichmann, referring to Custer as the "Eichmann of the Plains" in a 1996 Los Angeles Times interview. In his 1969 book Custer Died for Your Sins, Deloria condemned Custer's violations of the 1868 Fort Laramie Treaty that established the Black Hills region as unceded territory of the Sioux and Arapaho peoples. Custer's violations of the Fort Laramie Treaty included an 1874 gold expedition and the 1876 Battle of Greasy Grass (Battle of the Little Bighorn).

Critics have also highlighted Custer's 1868 Washita River surprise attack that killed Cheyenne non-combatants including mothers, children, and elders. Custer was following Generals William Sherman and Philip Sheridan's orders for "total war" on the Indigenous nations. Describing total war methods, Sherman wrote, "We must act with vindictive earnestness against the Sioux, even to their extermination, men, women, and children...during an assault, the soldiers can not pause to distinguish between male and female, or even discriminate as to age." There is "credible evidence" that following the attack, Custer and his men took "sexual liberties" with female captives, in the euphemism of one historian. Another historian writes, "There was a saying among the soldiers of the western frontier, a saying Custer and his officers could heartily endorse: 'Indian women rape easy.'"

Indigenous criticism of Custer's posthumous legacy may have begun immediately after Custer died. Good Fox (Lakota) recounted:
"I was told that after the battle two Cheyenne women came across Custer's body. They knew him, because he had attacked their peaceful village on the Washita. These women said, 'You smoked the peace pipe with us. Our chiefs told you that you would be killed if you ever made war on us again. But you would not listen. This will make you hear better.' The women each took an awl from their beaded cases and stuck them deep into Custer's ears."

In 1976, the American Indian Movement (AIM) celebrated the centennial anniversary of Sioux, Cheyenne, and Arapaho victory in the Battle of Greasy Grass, performing a victory dance around the marker of Custer's death. AIM continued protesting there demanding the official renaming of the “Custer Battlefield,” finally winning this demand in 1991.

In May 2021, the United Tribes of Michigan unanimously passed a resolution calling for the removal of a Custer statue in Monroe, Michigan. The resolution stated in part:
"(It) is widely perceived as offensive and a painful public reminder of the legacy of Indigenous people's genocide and present realities of systemic racism in our country... Custer is notoriously known as the 'Indian Killer' [...] Custer does not deserve any glory, nor the right to further torment minoritized citizens 145 years postmortem."

Monuments and memorials

 Counties are named in Custer's honor in six states: Colorado, Idaho (which is named for the General Custer Mine, which was named for Custer), Montana, Nebraska, Oklahoma, and South Dakota. 
Townships in Illinois, Michigan, and Minnesota were named for Custer. 
Other municipalities named after Custer include the villages of Custer, Michigan, and Custar, Ohio; the city of Custer, South Dakota; and the unincorporated town of Custer, Wisconsin. 
 Custer National Cemetery is within Little Bighorn Battlefield National Monument, the site of Custer's death.
 The George Armstrong Custer Equestrian Monument of Custer, by Edward Clark Potter, was erected in Monroe, Michigan, Custer's boyhood home, in 1910.
 Fort Custer National Military Reservation, near Augusta, Michigan, was built in 1917 on 130 parcels of land, as part of the military mobilization for World War I. During the war, some 90,000 troops passed through Camp Custer. 
 The establishment of Fort Custer National Cemetery (originally Fort Custer Post Cemetery) took place on September 18, 1943, with the first interment. On Memorial Day 1982, more than 33 years after the first resolution had been introduced in Congress, impressive ceremonies marked the official opening of the cemetery.
 Custer Hill is the main troop billeting area at Fort Riley, Kansas.  Custer's 1866 residence on the post has been preserved and is currently maintained as the Custer House Museum and meeting space (also sometimes referred to as Custer Home).
 The 85th Infantry Division was nicknamed The Custer Division.
 The Black Hills of South Dakota is full of evidence of Custer, with a county, town, and Custer State Park all located in the area.
A prominent mountain peak in the Black Hills bears his name.
 The Custer house at Fort Abraham Lincoln, near present-day Mandan, North Dakota, has been reconstructed as it was in Custer's day, along with the soldiers' barracks, block houses, etc. Annual re-enactments are held of Custer's 7th Cavalry's leaving for the Little Bighorn.
 On July 2, 2008, a marble monument to Brigadier General Custer was dedicated at the site of the 1863 Civil War Battle of Hunterstown, in Adams County, Pennsylvania.
 Custer Monument at the United States Military Academy was first unveiled in 1879. It now stands next to his grave in the West Point Cemetery.
Custer Memorial Monument at his birthplace was erected by the Ohio State Archaeological and Historical society in 1931. It is located near the remains of the foundation of his birthplace homestead in New Rumley, Ohio. Custer Monument is managed locally by the Custer Memorial Association.

Miscellany

In addition to "Autie", Custer acquired a number of nicknames. During the Civil War, after his promotion to become the youngest brigadier general in the Army at age 23, the press frequently called him "The Boy General". During his years on the Great Plains in the American Indian Wars, his troopers often referred to him with grudging admiration as "Iron Butt" and "Hard Ass" for his physical stamina in the saddle and his strict discipline, as well as with the more derisive "Ringlets" for his long, curling blond hair, which he frequently perfumed with cinnamon-scented hair oil.

Custer was quite fastidious in his grooming. Early in their marriage, Libbie wrote, "He brushes his teeth after every meal. I always laugh at him for it, also for washing his hands so frequently."

He was 5'11" tall and wore a size 38 jacket and size 9C boots. At various times he weighed between 143 pounds (at the end of the 1869 Kansas campaign) and a muscular 170 pounds. A splendid horseman, "Custer mounted was an inspiration." He was quite fit, able to jump to a standing position from lying flat on his back. He was a "power sleeper", able to get by on very short naps after falling asleep immediately on lying down. He "had a habit of throwing himself prone on the grass for a few minutes' rest and resembled a human island, entirely surrounded by crowding, panting dogs."

Throughout his travels, he gathered geological specimens, sending them to the University of Michigan. On September 10, 1873, he wrote Libbie, "the Indian battles hindered the collecting, while in that immediate region it was unsafe to go far from the command...."

He was well-liked by his native scouts, whose company he enjoyed. He often ate with them. A May 21, 1876, diary entry by Kellogg records, "General Custer visits scouts; much at home amongst them."

Before leaving the steamer Far West for the final leg of the journey, Custer wrote all night. His orderly John Burkman stood guard in front of his tent and on the morning of June 22, 1876, found Custer "hunched over on the cot, just his coat and his boots off, and the pen still in his hand."

During his service in Kentucky, Custer bought several thoroughbred horses. He took two on his last campaign, Vic (for Victory) and Dandy. During the march he changed horses every three hours. He rode Vic into his last battle.

Custer took his two staghounds Tuck and Bleuch with him during the last expedition. He left them with  orderly Burkman when he rode forward into battle. Burkman joined the packtrain. He regretted not accompanying Custer but lived until 1925, when he took his own life.

The common media image of Custer's appearance at the Last Stand—buckskin coat and long, curly blonde hair—is wrong. Although he and several other officers wore buckskin coats on the expedition, they took them off and packed them away because it was so hot. According to Soldier, an Arikara scout, "Custer took off his buckskin coat and tied it behind his saddle." Further, Custer—whose hair was thinning—joined a similarly balding Lieutenant Varnum and "had the clippers run over their heads" before leaving Fort Lincoln.

Dates of rank

See also

 Cultural depictions of George Armstrong Custer
 Custer's Revenge
 Fort Abraham Lincoln
 German-Americans in the Civil War
 Half Yellow Face
 White Swan
 List of American Civil War generals (Union)
 List of German Americans

References

Bibliography

 Ambrose, Stephen E. (1996 [1975]). Crazy Horse and Custer: The Parallel Lives of Two American Warriors. New York: Anchor Books. .
 Barnett, Louise (1996) Touched by Fire: The Life, Death, and Mythic Afterlife of George Armstrong Custer  New York, Henry Holt and Company, Inc. 
 Boulard, Garry (2006) The Swing Around the Circle: Andrew Johnson and the Train Ride that Destroyed a Presidency  
 Caudill, Edward and Paul Ashdown (2015). Inventing Custer: The Making of An American Legend. Lanham, MD: Rowman and Littlefield. 
 
 
 Goodrich, Thomas. Scalp Dance: Indian Warfare on the High Plains, 1865–1879. Mechanicsburg, PA: Stackpole Books, 1997. 
 
 
 Longacre, Edward G. (2000). Lincoln's Cavalrymen: A History of the Mounted Forces of the Army of the Potomac. Stackpole Books. .
 Longstreet, James, From Manassas to Appomattox: Memoirs of the Civil War in America, J.B. Lippincott, 1908.
 Mails, Thomas E. (1972). Mystic Warriors of the Plains. Doubleday. 
 Marshall, Joseph M. III. (2007). The Day the World Ended at Little Bighorn: A Lakota History. New York: Viking Press. 
 Merington, Marguerite, Ed. The Custer Story: The Life and Intimate Letters of General Custer and his Wife Elizabeth. (1950) 
 Michno, Gregory F. (1997). Lakota Noon: The Indian Narrative of Custer's Defeat. Mountain Press Publishing Company. .

 Perrett, Bryan. Last Stand: Famous Battles Against the Odds. London: Arms & Armour, 1993. 
 
 Punke, Michael, "Last Stand: George Bird Grinnell, the Battle to Save the Buffalo, and the Birth of the New West", Smithsonian Books, 2007, 
 Robbins, James S. The Real Custer: From Boy General to Tragic Hero. Washington, DC: Regnery Publishing, 2014, 
 Tagg, Larry. (1988). The Generals of Gettysburg. Savas Publishing. .
 Urwin, Gregory J. W., Custer Victorious, University of Nebraska Press, 1990, .
 Utley, Robert M. (2001). Cavalier in Buckskin: George Armstrong Custer and the Western Military Frontier, revised edition. Norman, OK: University of Oklahoma Press. .
 Vestal, Stanley. Warpath: The True Story of the Fighting Sioux Told in a Biography of Chief White Bull. Lincoln: University of Nebraska Press, 1934.  
 
 Welch, James, with Paul Stekler. (2007 [1994]). Killing Custer: The Battle of Little Bighorn and the Fate of the Plains Indians. New York: W.W. Norton & Company.
 Wert, Jeffry D. Custer: The Controversial Life of George Armstrong Custer. New York: Simon & Schuster, 1996. .

Further reading
 
 
 
 
 
 Stiles, T.J. Custer's Trials: A Life on the Frontier of a New America (2015), Pulitzer Prize.

External links

 Indian Wars and the Year of George Custer
 Friends of the Little Bighorn Battlefield
 Custer Battlefield Museum
 Little Big Horn Associates
 Little Bighorn History Alliance
 Kenneth M Hammer Collection on Custer and the Battle of the Little Bighorn, Harold G. Andersen Library, University of Wisconsin-Whitewater
 Gallery of Custer images
 Encyclopedia of Oklahoma History and Culture -Custer, George Armstrong
 
 
 
 George A. and Elizabeth B. Custer papers, Vault MSS 364 at L. Tom Perry Special Collections, Harold B. Lee Library, Brigham Young University
 Charles F. Bates Papers. Yale Collection of Western Americana, Beinecke Rare Book and Manuscript Library.

1839 births
1876 deaths
 
American mass murderers
American rapists
People from Harrison County, Ohio
American people of German descent
American people of English descent
American people of Scotch-Irish descent
Union Army generals
People of Ohio in the American Civil War
People of Michigan in the American Civil War
People of the Great Sioux War of 1876
United States Army personnel who were court-martialed
Comanche campaign
United States Military Academy alumni
People from Monroe, Michigan
Michigan Brigade
American military personnel killed in the American Indian Wars
Deaths by firearm in Montana
Burials at West Point Cemetery
Battle of the Little Bighorn
Genocide perpetrators
United States Army personnel of the Indian Wars